Flatbush is a neighborhood in the New York City borough of Brooklyn. The neighborhood consists of several subsections in central Brooklyn and is generally bounded by Prospect Park to the north, East Flatbush to the east, Midwood to the south, and Kensington and Parkville (which were characterized throughout much of the 20th century as subsections of Flatbush) to the west. The neighborhood had a population of 105,804 as of the 2010 United States Census. The modern neighborhood includes or borders several institutions of note, including Brooklyn College.

Flatbush was originally chartered as the Dutch Nieuw Nederland colony town of Midwout (or Midwoud or Medwoud). The town's former border runs through what is now Brooklyn Botanic Garden. Before it was incorporated into the City of Brooklyn in 1894, Flatbush described both the Town of Flatbush, incorporating a large swath of central Kings County extending east to the Queens County border, and the Village of Flatbush, formerly the heart of the current community. The neighborhood was consolidated into the City of Greater New York in 1898 and was connected to the rest of the city with the development of the New York City Subway in the early 20th century. During the 1970s and early 1980s, Flatbush experienced a shift in demographics due to white flight.

Flatbush is part of Brooklyn Community District 14, and its primary ZIP Code is 11226. It is patrolled by the 67th and 70th Precincts of the New York City Police Department. Politically, Flatbush is represented by the New York City Council's 40th and 45th Districts.

Etymology
The name Flatbush is a calque of the Dutch language Vlacke bos (vlacke or vlak, meaning "flat"; "Flatbush" meaning "flat woodland" or "wooded plain"), so named from woods that grew on the flat country.

History

Separate town
Flatbush was originally chartered as the Dutch Nieuw Nederland colony town of Midwout (or Midwoud or Medwoud) — from the Dutch words, med, "middle" and woud, "wood" — in 1651. Both names were used in the Dutch era, and Midwood was an alternative name for Flatbush into the early 20th century. In a reversal, Midwood, now the area immediately south of Brooklyn College, is often alternatively called "Flatbush", especially among Orthodox Jews. Midwood's residents predominately feature a mix of the latter and Irish Americans.

Flatbush and the five other towns of what was to become Kings County, were surrendered to the English in 1664. The town was the county seat for Kings County and was a center of life for what is now called Brooklyn. The compact center of the village of Flatbush was at the intersection of what are now Flatbush and Church avenues, where we still find an old Dutch Reformed Church and Erasmus Hall, the oldest high school in New York City.

Flatbush played a key role in the American Revolution. Flatbush was where significant skirmishes and battles of the Battle of Long Island took place. The town of Flatbush was occupied by the British for seven years, and some American prisoners of wars were housed there. As Kings County was settled largely by the Dutch, and as the Dutch were prominent in the slave trade, the area was somewhat sympathetic to the British side of the American Revolutionary War at the beginning of the conflict.  Kings County at the time had the highest concentration of slaves north of the Mason–Dixon line – according to the first federal census in 1790, one-third of the total population for the county were slaves. When a Loyalist Governor of Virginia supported freedom for slaves who supported and fought on the British side, landowners in Brooklyn were concerned that a full conflict between the Colonies and the British would result in loss of their critical source of labor. Loyalist residents of Flatbush included David Mathews, Mayor of New York City, who lived at what is now the intersection of Flatbush and Parkside avenues. Flatbush residents maintained their loyalist sympathies: the King's Arms, for example, appeared in the town's inn for a half-century after the conclusion of the conflict.

Historian Craig Steven Wilder calculated that between 70 and 80 percent of all Flatbush families in 1800 had an enslaved person. Johannes Lott, the original owner of the Hendrick I. Lott House, was one of the largest Kings County slaveowners with sixteen enslaved people in his household. For several decades after the Revolutionary War, New York merchants and farmers continued to engage in the slave trade. The Gradual Emancipation Law of 1799 emancipated people of African descent born after July 4, 1799. Women born before that date remained enslaved until the age of 25 and men to the age of 28. Men and women escaping enslavement often went to Manhattan, where they could live within the community of free blacks.

The influence of Dutch merchant and farming families remained strong in the area until after consolidation into the City of Greater New York in 1898, after which the development of Flatbush as a suburb, and then an integral part of the larger city, proceeded apace.

Before it was incorporated into the City of Brooklyn in 1894, Flatbush described both the Town of Flatbush, incorporating a large swath of central Kings County extending east to the Queens County border, and the Village of Flatbush, formerly the heart of the current community. Many of the remaining early Dutch structures are in the Flatlands and Marine Park neighborhoods.

Incorporation into city

Flatbush remained relatively distant from the City of Brooklyn's denser "Gold Coast" districts (such as Brooklyn Heights, Park Slope and Fort Greene-Clinton Hill, then known collectively as The Hill) following the consolidation of New York City in 1898, but the completion of direct New York City Subway routes to Midtown Manhattan via the BMT Brighton Line and IRT Nostrand Avenue Line in 1920 connected it to surrounding areas in an unprecedented way.

As six-story Art Deco and Colonial Revival
apartment houses (alongside analogous yet more affordable four-story walk-up buildings) were developed on Ocean Avenue and throughout its periphery, Flatbush nurtured a socioeconomically diverse population of Irish Americans, Italian Americans and American Jews; according to anthropologist Ansley Hamid, occupants ranged from "merchants [and] professionals" to "skilled [and] manual laborers." Although the Victorian Flatbush neighborhood associations endured and grew to encompass succeeding waves of new residents, urbanization and the increasing prevalence of automobiles compelled the remaining vestiges of the neighborhood's "Anglo-Dutch elite" to "[flee] in droves for the upscale suburbs of Westchester, Long Island and New Jersey" by the late 1920s.

A significant portion of Flatbush residents closely followed the Brooklyn Dodgers, which at the time were not only the team of Brooklyn but also of Flatbush in particular. Dodgers centerfielder Duke Snider was known as "the Duke of Flatbush". By 1958, however, the Dodgers left Brooklyn, and Ebbets Field eventually was torn down. Due to shifting neighborhood boundaries, Ebbets Field would today be considered to be in neighboring Crown Heights, as the ballpark was located just north of Empire Boulevard.

During the 1970s and early 1980s, Flatbush experienced a shift in demographics due to white flight as it transitioned from a white ethnic enclave to a mostly Caribbean-American community; in an ethnographic interview with Hamid, Trinidadian and Tobagonian American drug supplier and longtime resident "Patron" asserted that the demographic shift accelerated in 1974: "The whites started moving to the outskirts, further across Nostrand Avenue, or towards Sheepshead Bay. A lot moved out to Long Island. And blacks [West Indians] started moving in from Crown Heights, where buildings were being abandoned. A lot of West Indians bought up property, and then in the late 1970s, they too would start moving to Long Island, or to the nicer houses going towards Coney Island Avenue."
By now a working class milieu (according to "Patron", large apartment buildings gradually shed doormen, porters and other conveniences following the 1975 New York City fiscal crisis), a handful of affluent areas remained. Prospect Park South continued to attract a sizable number of wealthier homeowners, while doctors still resided and practiced on a stretch of Parkside Avenue immediately adjacent to Prospect Park. By the mid-1980s, however, the neighborhood had numerous abandoned or semi-abandoned buildings, many of which had fallen into a state of disrepair. While crime generally had long been prevalent in the community, it worsened significantly during the 1970s, '80s and '90s. A number of stores on Flatbush and Church Avenues fell victim to looting during the 1977 blackout, and a subsequent drug epidemic ravaged Flatbush during the 1980s and early 1990s.

In February 2016, Flatbush was one of four neighborhoods featured in an article in The New York Times about "New York's Next Hot Neighborhoods". After the Vision Zero traffic safety initiative was implemented across the city, WNYC found the New York City Police Department targeting this neighborhood 36 percent more than other whiter neighborhoods like Williamsburg and Greenpoint.

Demographics

Based on data from the 2010 United States Census, the population of Flatbush was 105,804, a decrease of 5,071 (4.6%) from the 110,875 counted in 2000.

The racial makeup of the neighborhood was 19.9% (21,030) White, 48.6% (51,470) African American, 0.3% (281) Native American, 9.2% (9,712) Asian, 0.0% (26) Pacific Islander, 0.5% (575) from other races, and 1.9% (2,051) from two or more races. Hispanic or Latino of any race were 19.5% (20,659) of the population.

The entirety of Community Board 14, which comprises Flatbush and Midwood, had 165,543 inhabitants as of NYC Health's 2018 Community Health Profile, with an average life expectancy of 82.4 years. This is slightly higher than the median life expectancy of 81.2 for all New York City neighborhoods. Most inhabitants are middle-aged adults and youth: 25% are between the ages of 0–17, 29% between 25–44, and 24% between 45–64. The ratio of college-aged and elderly residents was lower, at 9% and 13% respectively.

As of 2016, the median household income in Community Board 14 was $56,599. In 2018, an estimated 22% of Flatbush and Midwood residents lived in poverty, compared to 21% in all of Brooklyn and 20% in all of New York City. One in eleven residents (9%) were unemployed, compared to 9% in the rest of both Brooklyn and New York City. Rent burden, or the percentage of residents who have difficulty paying their rent, is 57% in Flatbush and Midwood, higher than the citywide and boroughwide rates of 52% and 51% respectively.

Culture 
While Flatbush is predominantly African American and West Indian, there are sizable numbers of White Americans, Latinos and Indian Americans living within its borders.  A majority of residents are working class, but there also are middle-class and wealthier residents who call Flatbush home. The primary commercial strips are Flatbush, Church, and Coney Island Avenues. One can find Caribbean food, Soul food, Chinese, Mexican and South Asian restaurants.  Most of the businesses are small, with some larger businesses also present. A large part of the culture in Flatbush is the use of "dollar vans". These "vans" are actually minibuses that provide a cheaper alternative to riding the MTA. Residents pay $2 to travel along Flatbush Avenue from Kings Plaza to Tillary St. While many dollar vans operate illegally, they are still a major part of transportion in Flatbush.

Flatbush housing varies in character. It generally features apartment buildings, though some rowhouses also are present.  Older, Victorian-style housing can be found in Prospect Park South, and brownstones are in Prospect Lefferts Gardens.

The Flatbush community has been receiving an influx of immigrants from the Caribbean, mostly from Guyana,  Haiti, Trinidad and Tobago, Jamaica, Grenada, Barbados, Saint Lucia, Saint Vincent and the Grenadines, Dominica, Antigua and Barbuda, Saint Kitts and Nevis and Belize, since the 1980s, as well as immigrants from South Asia, primarily India, Pakistan and Bangladesh and African countries like Ghana, Zimbabwe, Nigeria, and Kenya. Haitians are the largest ethnic group in Flatbush.  Prior to the arrival of these groups, the Flatbush community had already been diverse, with many Italian-Americans, Irish-Americans, African-Americans and Jewish-Americans.

As according to the 2020 census data from New York City Department of City Planning showed a diverse racial population, though the concentrations of each racial groups varied between different sections of Flatbush. Western portions of the community had between 10,000 to 19,999 White residents, 5,000 to 9,999 Black residents, and each the Hispanic and Asian populations were between 5,000 to 9,999 residents. Eastern portions of the community had between 30,000 to 39,999 Black residents, 10,000 to 19,999 Hispanic residents, and 5,000 to 9,999 White residents.

Subsections and geographic boundaries

The former town of Flatbush coincided roughly with Brooklyn Community District 14, which runs north-south from Prospect Park to Kings Highway. The boundaries of the neighborhood today are not precisely defined, but much of the areas below have typically been considered part of the community. The neighborhoods of Flatbush extend south from the old Brooklyn City Line north of the southern edges of Prospect Park, the Brooklyn Botanic Garden and Empire Boulevard.  The southern border of Flatbush neighborhoods is approximately on the line of the Bay Ridge Branch, which runs to the south of Avenue H, the campus of Brooklyn College, and "The Junction" where Flatbush and Nostrand Avenues intersect. Flatbush's eastern border is roughly around New York Avenue, while its western border is Coney Island Avenue.

Neighborhoods within Flatbush include the planned communities of Prospect Park South, the Beverley Squares (Beverley Square East and Beverley Square West), Prospect Lefferts Gardens, Ditmas Park, Fiske Terrace, Victorian Flatbush, and Albemarle-Kenmore Terrace.  Bordering Flatbush on the north are the community of Crown Heights and the former neighborhood of Pigtown. On the east, within the old town of Flatbush, is East Flatbush, on the west are Kensington and Parkville (formerly Greenfield), and on the south is Midwood. Midwood, also part of Community District 14, was historically part of the neighboring former towns of New Utrecht, Gravesend and Flatlands. Flatbush includes the southernmost portion of Prospect Park.

Notable institutions

Well-known institutions within Flatbush include Erasmus Hall High School, the Parade Ground, the Flatbush Dutch Reformed Church, and Brooklyn College. The neighborhood also contained Ebbets Field, the last Brooklyn home of the Brooklyn Dodgers baseball team before it was demolished in 1960; however, due to imprecise boundaries, the Ebbets Field site may also be considered to be in Crown Heights. The Kings Theatre, listed on the National Register of Historic Places, operated from 1929 to 1977; it reopened as a live show venue in February 2015 after extensive renovations.

Community organizations 
The bustling business district and neighborhoods of Flatbush are supported by several important community organizations. The Flatbush Avenue Business Improvement District provides services to keep Flatbush Avenue from Parkside Avenue to Cortelyou Road clean, safe and profitable for its businesses. Every year, the Flatbush BID organizes the Flatbush Avenue Street Fair, an event that celebrates the cultures of the community. The Flatbush Development Corporation (FDC) is a nonprofit that hosts events and programs that are aimed to support the "vitality, diversity and quality of life" in the Flatbush community. CAMBA, Inc. is a Flatbush-based nonprofit that since 1977 has provided housing, youth education and development, legal services and healthcare services to residents of Flatbush and beyond. Flatbush Cats, a non-profit rescue organization, has a large social media following.

Police and crime
Flatbush is patrolled by two precincts of the NYPD. The 70th Precinct is located at 154 Lawrence Avenue in  Parkville  and serves Ditmas Park, Prospect Park South, and Midwood, while the 67th Precinct is located at 2820 Snyder Avenue and serves East Flatbush. The 70th Precinct ranked 30th safest out of 69 patrol areas for per-capita crime in 2010, while the 67th Precinct ranked 40th safest.  , with a non-fatal assault rate of 42 per 100,000 people, Flatbush and Midwood's rate of violent crimes per capita is less than that of the city as a whole. The incarceration rate of 372 per 100,000 people is lower than that of the city as a whole.

The 70th Precinct has a lower crime rate than in the 1990s, with crimes across all categories having decreased by 89.1% between 1990 and 2018. The precinct reported 6 murders, 27 rapes, 162 robberies, 273 felony assaults, 173 burglaries, 527 grand larcenies, and 75 grand larcenies auto in 2018. The 67th Precinct also has a lower crime rate than in the 1990s, with crimes across all categories having decreased by 79.9% between 1990 and 2018. The precinct reported 6 murders, 43 rapes, 246 robberies, 601 felony assaults, 225 burglaries, 586 grand larcenies, and 98 grand larcenies auto in 2018. 

In 1997, officers from the 70th Precinct restrained and sexually assaulted innocent suspect Abner Louima in the precinct's restroom. Louima received a settlement from the city of $8.7 million, at that time the largest individual payment for an NYPD brutality case. Approximately $1.6 million of the settlement money came from the police union, which allegedly tried to help cover up the crime.

Fire safety 
Flatbush is served by three New York City Fire Department (FDNY) fire stations:

 Engine Co. 255/Ladder Co. 157 — 1367 Rogers Avenue
 Engine Co. 281/Ladder Co. 147 — 1210 Cortelyou Road
 Engine Co. 248/Battalion 41 — 2900 Snyder Avenue

Health 
, preterm births are more common in Flatbush and Midwood than in other places citywide, though births to teenage mothers are less common. In Flatbush and Midwood, there were 99 preterm births per 1,000 live births (compared to 87 per 1,000 citywide), and 17.1 births to teenage mothers per 1,000 live births (compared to 19.3 per 1,000 citywide). Flatbush and Midwood has a relatively high population of residents who are uninsured, or who receive healthcare through Medicaid. In 2018, this population of uninsured residents was estimated to be 16%, which is higher than the citywide rate of 12%.

Ten percent of Flatbush and Midwood residents are smokers, which is slightly lower than the city average of 14% of residents being smokers. In Flatbush and Midwood, 28% of residents are obese, 13% are diabetic, and 31% have high blood pressure—compared to the citywide averages of 24%, 11%, and 28% respectively. In addition, 21% of children are obese, compared to the citywide average of 20%.

Eighty percent of residents eat some fruits and vegetables every day, which is lower than the city's average of 87%. In 2018, 77% of residents described their health as "good", "very good", or "excellent", slightly less than the city's average of 78%. For every supermarket in Flatbush and Midwood, there are 21 bodegas.

Major hospitals in close proximity to Flatbush include Kings County Hospital and SUNY Downstate Medical Center. The facilities are located in neighboring East Flatbush just east of New York Avenue.

Post offices and ZIP Codes
Flatbush is covered by ZIP Codes 11203, 11210, 11225, and 11226. The latter is the primary ZIP Code for Flatbush.

The United States Post Office branches in Flatbush are the Flatbush Station at 2273 Church Avenue,  the Newkirk Station at 1525 Newkirk Avenue, and the Vanderveer Station at 2319 Nostrand Avenue.

Education 

Flatbush and Midwood generally has a similar ratio of college-educated residents to the rest of the city . Though 43% of residents age 25 and older have a college education or higher, 18% have less than a high school education and 39% are high school graduates or have some college education. By contrast, 40% of Brooklynites and 38% of city residents have a college education or higher. The percentage of Flatbush and Midwood students excelling in math rose from 43 percent in 2000 to 68 percent in 2011, though reading achievement remained steady at 48% during the same time period.

Flatbush and Midwood's rate of elementary school student absenteeism is about equal to the rest of New York City. In Flatbush and Midwood, 18% of elementary school students missed twenty or more days per school year, compared to the citywide average of 20% of students. Additionally, 75% of high school students in Flatbush and Midwood graduate on time, equal to the citywide average of 75% of students.

Schools 
Flatbush is home to a number of elementary and intermediate schools, as well as the Erasmus Hall High School campus.  Founded in 1786, it has a long list of famous alumni.  Its building has been expanded numerous times, and is notable for its relatively unique architecture.  Since 1994, the building has been divided internally into five smaller high schools, each concentrating on a different academic area.

Brooklyn College (one of the four-year colleges in the City University of New York system) occupies a  campus shared between the neighborhoods of Flatbush and Midwood.

Several Jewish yeshivas are in the neighborhood, including the Mir Yeshiva, Yeshiva Rabbi Chaim Berlin, Yeshiva Torah Vodaas, Yeshiva Torah Temimah, Yeshiva Tiferes Yisroel, and the Yeshivah of Flatbush. Combined, they form a major center of Jewish learning. The area had an estimated total enrollment of 14,500 students in 2004.

Libraries 
The Brooklyn Public Library (BPL) has three branches in Flatbush. The Flatbush branch is located at 22 Linden Boulevard east of Flatbush Avenue. It was built in 1905 as a Carnegie library branch. The Clarendon branch is located at 2035 Nostrand Avenue south of Farragut Road. It was founded as a deposit station with a small circulating collection in 1913. The branch moved into its current building in 1954, and it was renovated in 1990. The Crown Heights branch, located on the border with Crown Heights, is located at 560 New York Avenue near Maple Street.

Transportation

Flatbush is well served by public transportation. On the New York City Subway, the BMT Brighton Line has a number of stops within the community. The stretch of stations from Prospect Park to Avenue H is in Flatbush. The IRT Nostrand Avenue Line also serves Flatbush from Sterling Street to the terminal Flatbush Avenue–Brooklyn College station.

The  are MTA Regional Bus Operations routes that serve the neighborhood; some of them also have limited-stop variants, and the B44 also has a Select Bus Service variant. Additionally, the  express buses serve Flatbush.

The major roadways through Flatbush include Flatbush Avenue, Nostrand Avenue and Ocean Avenue, which are North-South corridors, and Linden Boulevard, Church Avenue and Caton Avenue, which are East-West corridors.

In popular culture

Flatbush is mentioned in The Lords of Flatbush, a 1974 film set in 1958. 
 It's also in ABC's 1976 unaired except for its pilot episode sitcom, Flatbush Avenue J, based somewhat on the 1974 dramedy movie, The Lords of Flatbush, only with its titular former 1950s teenagers now mid 1970s adults in their 30's, some of whom having moved away while the best "cream of the crop" have stayed, e.g. one of them becoming a NYCPD officer living locally at a time when many other New York City officers have moved out of the city for less costly, less congested and less crime filled non-local suburbs for themselves and their families.   
 The neighborhood is also in CBS's eponymous 1979 sitcom, also based somewhat on The Lords of Flatbush movie but with five modern day newly high school-graduated 18-ish year olds.
According to Mel Blanc, the character's original voice actor, Bugs Bunny has a Flatbush accent.
The Mario Brothers, Mario and Luigi, from the Mario video game franchise, are said to be from Flatbush. In the animated TV series The Super Mario Bros. Super Show!, as well as the Super Mario Bros. Hollywood movie, Mario and Luigi's business, "Mario Brothers Plumbing Services", is operated out of Flatbush.
Philip J. Fry, from the TV series Futurama, is originally from Flatbush.
Flatbush is the setting of the TV series Flatbush Misdemeanors
Flatbush is one of the principal locations featured in William Styron's novel Sophie's Choice. The protagonist, Stingo, takes up residence there in 1947.  He befriends Sophie and Nathan, and soon learns of Sophie's tortured history.
Claudius Lyon, the parody of the fictional detective Nero Wolfe created by Loren Estleman, lives in a brownstone in Flatbush as part of his efforts to mimic Wolfe's lifestyle.
The Flatbush Zombies, a popular hip-hop trio, is named after Flatbush, where the trio grew up.
 In The Incredible Mr. Limpet (1964), Bessie (Carole Cook) tells her husband Henry (Don Knotts) that "if you paid half as much attention to me as you do those fish I'd be the happiest wife in Flatbush."

Notable residents
Notable residents of Flatbush have included:

22Gz (born 1997), Brooklyn drill rapper
Michael Badalucco (born 1954), actor
Joseph Barbera (1911–2006), animator
John Boardman (born 1932), professor emeritus of physics, Brooklyn College; science fiction fan, author and fanzine publisher; and gaming authority.
Dane Clark (1912–1998), actor
Roz Chast (born 1954), cartoonist for The New Yorker
Al Davis (1929–2011), owner and general manager of the Oakland Raiders
Neil Diamond (born 1941), singer
David Draiman (born 1973), vocalist for Disturbed.
Da Bush Babees
Cella Dwellas
East Flatbush Project
Richard Fariña (1937-1966), folksinger, novelist and poet 
Patrick Fitzgerald (born 1960), attorney.
Fu-Schnickens
Full Force
Sol Forman (1903–2001), restaurateur, owner of Peter Luger Steak House
Flatbush Zombies
Ruth Bader Ginsburg (1933–2020), United States Supreme Court Justice.
Sidney "Sid" Gordon (1917–1975), Major League Baseball All-Star player.
Sonia Greene (1883–1972), pulp fiction writer and amateur publisher.
Susan Hayward (1917–1975), actress.
Leona Helmsley (1920–2007), businesswoman who was known for her flamboyant personality and her reputation for tyrannical behavior.
Hurricane G, rapper.
John Jea (1773–unknown) writer best known for his autobiography describing his time in slavery in Flatbush
Jidenna (born 1985), rapper.
Joey Badass (born 1995), rapper, singer, songwriter, record producer and actor.
JPEGMafia (born 1989), rapper and record producer.
Eric Kaplan (born 1971), television writer and producer.
 Alvin Klein (c. 1938–2009), theater critic for The New York Times
Talib Kweli (born 1975), rapper, entrepreneur and activist.
Jackie Loughery (born 1930), actress and beauty pageant titleholder who was crowned Miss USA 1952.
Norman Mailer (1923-2007), novelist.
David Mathews, lawyer and politician
Jimmy McMillan (born 1946), political activist and perennial candidate.
Joe Paterno (1926-2012), football coach.
JTG
Rampage
Red Cafe
Busta Rhymes
Chubb Rock
Rowdy Rebel
Dmitry Salita, professional boxer
Bernie Sanders, politician and activist; United States senator from Vermont
Shaggy
Mimi Sheraton (born Miriam Solomon; 1926), food critic and writer
Bobby Shmurda (born 1994), rapper.
Special Ed (born 1972), rapper.
Richard Sheirer
Michael Showalter (born 1970), comedian, actor, director, writer, and producer.
Shyne
Peter Steele
Capital Steez
Barbra Streisand (born 1942), singer and actress
Bruce Sudano
Paul Sylbert (1928-2016), production designer, art director and set designer.
The Underachievers
Don Vultaggio, billionaire co-founder of Arizona Beverage Company 
Devin Wenig (born 1966), business executive, president and CEO of eBay, CEO of Thomson Reuters Markets
Michael K. Williams, actor
Angela Yee, radio personality

Sheff G, Brooklyn drill rapper (born 1998)

References

External links

Early history of Flatbush, pre-1842 Accessed 2008-11-17

 
1651 establishments in the Dutch Empire
Populated places established in 1651
Caribbean-American culture in New York City
Neighborhoods in Brooklyn
Former towns in New York City